The Diary of a Superfluous Man (Dnevnik lishnego cheloveka) is an 1850 novella by the Russian author Ivan Turgenev. It is written in the first person in the form of a diary by a man, Tchulkaturin, who, though only 31 years old, is dying of an unspecified illness and has only a few days left to live as he recounts incidents of his life. The story has become the archetype for the Russian literary concept of the superfluous man. It was first published in 1850 in Otechestvennye Zapiski.

External links
The Diary of a Superfluous Man, at Internet Archive (scanned books multiple formats)

1850 books
Novellas by Ivan Turgenev
Works originally published in Otechestvennye Zapiski